Keith Mason (born ) is a former rugby league footballer who played in the 2000s and 2010s. 

Mason played in three Challenge Cup finals, winning one in 2004 for St Helens against Wigan in Cardiff. He also won the League Leaders' Shield with St Helens in 2005. 

He won two caps for Wales at international level, and also played for Great Britain and England Under-21s.

Background
Mason was born Dewsbury, West Yorkshire, England.

Club career
In a 14-year career Mason played for four Super League teams; the Wakefield Trinity Wildcats, St Helens, the Castleford Tigers, and the Huddersfield Giants, as well as playing in the NRL for two seasons with Melbourne Storm.

In 2009 Mason won the 'Coaches' Player of The Year', the 'Directors' Player of The Year', and the Huddersfield Giants 'Man of Steel Award', he also appeared in a Challenge Cup final in the same year at the Wembley Stadium against Warrington Wolves, a boyhood dream come true for Mason, also appearing in 2 more Challenge Cup finals in 2004 which he won for St Helens against Wigan at the Millennium Stadium playing .

International honours
Keith Mason won caps for Wales while at Wakefield Trinity Wildcats in 2001 against England, and while at Melbourne Storm in 2002 against New Zealand in 2002. He also represented England at under-21 level on the tour to South Africa in 2001.

Acting career
At the end of the 2013 season, Mason retired from playing rugby league in order to pursue a career as an actor. He appeared in the film Skin Traffik alongside Mickey Rourke and Daryl Hannah, and has subsequently appeared in the TV series Peaky Blinders.

In 2021 he starred in, and produced, his first feature film, Imperative.

References

External links 

(archived by web.archive.org) Profile at giantsrl.dnsupdate.co.uk
(archived by web.archive.org) Profile at superleague.co.uk
Profile at saints.org.uk
 ĎŔƑ "My life in rugby league: Keith Mason interview at rugbyleague.org
England too strong for brave Wales
Wakefield suffer Mason KO

1982 births
Living people
Castleford Tigers players
English male film actors
English male television actors
English people of Welsh descent
English rugby league players
Huddersfield Giants players
Melbourne Storm players
Rugby league players from Dewsbury
Rugby league props
St Helens R.F.C. players
Wakefield Trinity players
Wales national rugby league team players